Goiânia Esporte Clube, or Goiânia as they are usually called, are a Brazilian football team from Goiânia in Goiás state, founded on July 5, 1938. Their home stadium is the Olímpico Pedro Ludovico, which has a maximum capacity of 10,000 people. They play in black and white shirts, white shorts and black socks. Goiânia competed several times in the Série A. The club has the fourth largest fan base in the state.

History

Goiânia Esporte Clube were founded on July 5, 1938, and it is the oldest club of the state of Goiás. The club won the Campeonato Goiano in 1945, 1946, 1948, 1950, 1951, 1952, 1953, 1954, 1956, 1958, 1959, 1960, 1968 and 1974. However, after the Estádio Serra Dourada was inaugurated, Goiânia never won the state championship again. They won the Copa Brasil Central in 1967, and the Campeonato Goiano Second Level in 1998 and in 2006.

The first time the club competed in the Série A was in 1975, when they finished were eliminated in the first stage. In 1976, they were again eliminated in the first stage, being eliminated in the first stage again in 1977, and in 1979. Goiânia also competed in the Copa João Havelange, in 2000, when they were eliminated in the White Module's first stage.

Goiânia competed twice in the Copa do Brasil. The first time was in 1991, when they were eliminated in the first round by Fluminense de Feira. The second time was in 2001, when they beat América Mineiro in the first round, but were eliminated by Corinthians in the second round.

Achievements

 Copa Brasil Central:
 Winners (1): 1967
 Campeonato Goiano:
 Winners (14): 1945, 1946, 1948, 1950, 1951, 1952, 1953, 1954, 1956, 1958, 1959, 1960, 1968, 1974
 Campeonato Goiano Second Level:
 Winners (2): 1998, 2006

Stadium
Goiânia play their home games at Olímpico Pedro Ludovico, located in Goiânia. The stadium has a maximum capacity of 13,500 people, and was inaugurated on September 3, 1941.

Rivals
The rivalry between Goiânia and Atlético Goianiense is the oldest of the state. The derby against Goiás is known as Clássico Go-Go. Vila Nova is another rival.

References

External links
 Goiânia Esporte Clube official website

 
Association football clubs established in 1938
Football clubs in Goiás
1938 establishments in Brazil